This list shows the IUCN Red List status of the 120 mammal species occurring in Metropolitan France. One of them is critically endangered, two are endangered, thirteen are vulnerable, and four are near threatened. One of the species listed for France is considered to be extinct.

The following tags are used to highlight each species' conservation status as assessed on the respective IUCN Red Lists published by the International Union for Conservation of Nature:

Order: Rodentia (rodents)

Rodents make up the largest order of mammals, with over 40% of mammalian species. They have two incisors in the upper and lower jaw which grow continually and must be kept short by gnawing.
Suborder: Sciurognathi
Family: Castoridae (beavers)
Genus: Castor
 Eurasian beaver, C. fiber 
North American beaver, C. canadensis  introduced, extirpated
Family: Sciuridae (squirrels)
Subfamily: Sciurinae
Genus: Sciurus
Red squirrel, S. vulgaris 
Subfamily: Xerinae
Genus: Marmota
 Alpine marmot, M. marmota 
Family: Gliridae (dormice)
Subfamily: Leithiinae
Genus: Eliomys
Garden dormouse, E. quercinus 
Genus: Muscardinus
 Hazel dormouse, M. avellanarius 
Subfamily: Glirinae
Genus: Glis
 European edible dormouse, G. glis 
Family: Cricetidae
Subfamily: Cricetinae
Genus: Cricetus
European hamster, C. cricetus 
Subfamily: Arvicolinae
Genus: Arvicola
European water vole, A. amphibius 
Southwestern water vole, A. sapidus 
Genus: Chionomys
 Snow vole, C. nivalis 
Genus: Clethrionomys
 Bank vole, C. glareolus 
Genus: Microtus
 Field vole, M. agrestis 
 Common vole, M. arvalis 
Cabrera's vole, M. cabrerae 
 Mediterranean pine vole, M. duodecimcostatus 
 Gerbe's vole, M. gerbei 
 Lusitanian pine vole, M. lusitanicus 
 Alpine pine vole, M. multiplex 
 Savi's pine vole, M. savii 
 European pine vole, M. subterraneus 
Family: Muridae (mice, rats, voles, gerbils, hamsters, etc.)
Subfamily: Murinae
Genus: Mus
 House mouse, M. musculus 
 Algerian mouse, M. spretus 
Genus: Apodemus
 Alpine field mouse, A. alpicola 
 Yellow-necked mouse, A. flavicollis 
 Wood mouse, A. sylvaticus 
Genus: Micromys
 Eurasian harvest mouse, M. minutus 
Genus: Rattus
Brown rat, R. norvegicus  introduced
Black rat, R. rattus  introduced

Order: Lagomorpha (lagomorphs)

The lagomorphs comprise two families, Leporidae (hares and rabbits), and Ochotonidae (pikas). Though they can resemble rodents, and were classified as a superfamily in that order until the early 20th century, they have since been considered a separate order. They differ from rodents in a number of physical characteristics, such as having four incisors in the upper jaw rather than two.
Family: Leporidae (rabbits, hares)
Genus: Lepus
Corsican hare, L. corsicanus 
 European hare, L. europaeus 
Mountain hare, L. timidus 
Genus: Oryctolagus
European rabbit, O. cuniculus 
Family: Ochotonidae (pikas)
Genus: Prolagus
Sardinian pika, P. sardus

Order: Eulipotyphla (shrews, hedgehogs, gymnures, moles and solenodons)

Eulipotyphlans are insectivorous mammals. Shrews and solenodons resemble mice, hedgehogs carry spines, gymnures look more like large rats, while moles are stout-bodied burrowers.
Family: Erinaceidae (hedgehogs and gymnures)
Subfamily: Erinaceinae
Genus: Atelerix
 North African hedgehog, A. algirus  extirpated
Genus: Erinaceus
 West European hedgehog, E. europaeus 

Family: Soricidae (shrews)
Subfamily: Crocidurinae
Genus: Crocidura
 Bicolored shrew, C. leucodon 
 Greater white-toothed shrew, C. russula 
Lesser white-toothed shrew, C. suaveolens 
Genus: Suncus
 Etruscan shrew, S. etruscus 
Subfamily: Soricinae
Tribe: Nectogalini
Genus: Neomys
 Southern water shrew, N. anomalus 
 Eurasian water shrew, N. fodiens 
Tribe: Soricini
Genus: Sorex
 Alpine shrew, S. alpinus 
 Common shrew, S. araneus 
 Crowned shrew, S. coronatus 
 Eurasian pygmy shrew, S. minutus 
Family: Talpidae (moles)
Subfamily: Talpinae
Tribe: Desmanini
Genus: Galemys
 Pyrenean desman, G. pyrenaicus 
Tribe: Talpini
Genus: Talpa
 Mediterranean mole, T. caeca 
 European mole, T. europaea 
 Roman mole, T. romana

Order: Chiroptera (bats)

The bats' most distinguishing feature is that their forelimbs are developed as wings, making them the only mammals capable of flight. Bat species account for about 20% of all mammals.
Family: Vespertilionidae
Subfamily: Myotinae
Genus: Myotis
Bechstein's bat, M. bechsteini 
Lesser mouse-eared bat, M. blythii 
Brandt's bat, M. brandti 
Long-fingered bat, M. capaccinii 
 Cryptic myotis, M. crypticus
Pond bat, M. dasycneme 
Daubenton's bat, M. daubentonii  
Geoffroy's bat, M. emarginatus 
Escalera's bat, M. escalerai 
Greater mouse-eared bat, M. myotis 
Whiskered bat, M. mystacinus 
Natterer's bat, M. nattereri 
Subfamily: Vespertilioninae
Genus: Barbastella
Western barbastelle, B. barbastellus 
Genus: Eptesicus
 Northern bat, E. nilssoni 
 Serotine bat, E. serotinus 
Genus: Hypsugo
Savi's pipistrelle, H. savii 
Genus: Nyctalus
Greater noctule bat, N. lasiopterus 
Lesser noctule, N. leisleri 
Common noctule, N. noctula 
Genus: Pipistrellus
 Kuhl's pipistrelle, P. kuhlii 
Nathusius' pipistrelle, P. nathusii 
 Common pipistrelle, P. pipistrellus 
Genus: Plecotus
Brown long-eared bat, P. auritus 
Grey long-eared bat, P. austriacus 
Genus: Vespertilio
 Parti-coloured bat, V. murinus 
Subfamily: Miniopterinae
Genus: Miniopterus
Common bent-wing bat, M. schreibersii 
Family: Molossidae
Genus: Tadarida
European free-tailed bat, T. teniotis 
Family: Rhinolophidae
Subfamily: Rhinolophinae
Genus: Rhinolophus
Mediterranean horseshoe bat, R. euryale 
Greater horseshoe bat, R. ferrumequinum 
Lesser horseshoe bat, R. hipposideros 
Mehely's horseshoe bat, R. mehelyi

Order: Cetacea (whales)

The order Cetacea includes whales, dolphins and porpoises. They are the mammals most fully adapted to aquatic life with a spindle-shaped nearly hairless body, protected by a thick layer of blubber, and forelimbs and tail modified to provide propulsion underwater.

Suborder: Mysticeti
Family: Balaenidae (right whales) 
Genus: Balaena
 Bowhead whale, Balaena mysticetus LC vagrant
Genus: Eubalaena
 North Atlantic right whale, Eubalaena glacialis CR or functionally extinct in European waters
Family: Balaenopteridae (rorquals)
Subfamily: Megapterinae
Genus: Megaptera
 Humpback whale, Megaptera novaeangliae LC
Subfamily: Balaenopterinae
Genus: Balaenoptera
 Fin whale, Balaenoptera physalus EN
 Minke whale, Balaenoptera acutorostrata NT
Suborder: Odontoceti
Family: Kogiidae
Genus: Kogia
 Pygmy sperm whale, Kogia breviceps LC
Family: Ziphidae (beaked whales)
Genus: Ziphius
 Cuvier's beaked whale, Ziphius cavirostris DD
Subfamily: Hyperoodontidae
Genus: Hyperoodon
 Northern bottlenose whale, Hyperoodon ampullatus DD
Genus: Mesoplodon
 Sowerby's beaked whale, Mesoplodon bidens DD
 True's beaked whale, Mesoplodon mirus DD
Family: Phocoenidae (porpoises)
Genus: Phocoena
 Harbour porpoise, Phocoena phocoena VU
Family: Delphinidae (marine dolphins)
 Genus: Lagenorhynchus
 White-beaked dolphin, Lagenorhynchus albirostris LC
 Genus: Leucopleurus
 Atlantic white-sided dolphin, Leucopleurus acutus LC
Genus: Steno
 Rough-toothed dolphin, Steno bredanensis DD
Genus: Tursiops
 Bottlenose dolphin, Tursiops truncatus DD
Genus: Stenella
 Striped dolphin, Stenella coeruleoalba LC
Genus: Delphinus
 Short-beaked common dolphin, Delphinus delphis LC
Genus: Grampus
 Risso's dolphin, Grampus griseus DD
Genus: Feresa
 Pygmy killer whale, Feresa attenuata DD
Genus: Pseudorca
 False killer whale, Pseudorca crassidens LC
Genus: Globicephala
 Pilot whale, Globicephala melas LC
Genus: Orcinus
 Orca, Orcinus orca DD
Superfamily: Platanistoidea
Family: Monodontidae
Genus: Delphinapterus
 Beluga, Delphinapterus leucas VU

Order: Carnivora (carnivorans)

There are over 260 species of carnivorans, the majority of which feed primarily on meat. They have a characteristic skull shape and dentition.
Suborder: Feliformia
Family: Felidae (cats)
Subfamily: Felinae
Genus: Felis
 European wildcat, F. silvestris 
Genus: Lynx
 Eurasian lynx, L. lynx 
 Iberian lynx, L. pardinus  extirpated 
Family: Viverridae
Subfamily: Viverrinae
Genus: Genetta
 Common genet, G. genetta  introduced
Suborder: Caniformia
Family: Canidae (dogs, foxes)
Genus: Canis
Golden jackal, C. aureus   vagrant
Gray wolf, C. lupus 
 Italian wolf, C. l. italicus
 Eurasian wolf, C. l. lupus
Genus: Nyctereutes
Raccoon dog, N. procyonoides  introduced
Genus: Vulpes
 Red fox, V. vulpes 
Family: Ursidae (bears)
Genus: Ursus
 Brown bear, U. arctos 
 Eurasian brown bear, U. a. arctos
Family: Mustelidae (mustelids)
Genus: Lutra
 European otter, L. lutra 
Genus: Martes
 Beech marten, M. foina 
 European pine marten, M. martes 
Genus: Meles
 European badger, M. meles 
Genus: Mustela
 Stoat, M. erminea 
 European mink, M. lutreola 
 Least weasel, M. nivalis 
 European polecat, M. putorius 
Genus: Neogale
American mink, N. vison  introduced
Family: Phocidae (earless seals)
Genus: Erignathus
 Bearded seal, E. barbatus 
Genus: Halichoerus
 Grey seal, H. grypus 
Genus: Monachus
 Mediterranean monk seal, M. monachus  extirpated
Genus: Phoca
 Common seal, P. vitulina

Order: Artiodactyla (even-toed ungulates)

The even-toed ungulates are ungulates whose weight is borne about equally by the third and fourth toes, rather than mostly or entirely by the third as in perissodactyls. There are about 220 artiodactyl species, including many that are of great economic importance to humans.
Family: Cervidae (deer)
Subfamily: Cervinae
Genus: Cervus
Red deer, C. elaphus 
Genus: Dama
 European fallow deer, D. dama  introduced
Subfamily: Capreolinae
Genus: Alces
 Eurasian elk, A. alces  extirpated
Genus: Capreolus
 Roe deer, C. capreolus 
Family: Bovidae (cattle, antelope, sheep, goats)
Subfamily: Bovidae
Genus: Bison
 European bison, B. bonasus  extirpated
Subfamily: Caprinae
Genus: Capra
 Alpine ibex, C. ibex  reintroduced
 Iberian ibex, C. pyrenaica  reintroduced
 Pyrenean ibex, C. p. pyrenaica 
 Western Spanish ibex, C. p. victoriae introduced
Genus: Rupicapra
Pyrenean chamois, R. pyrenaica 
Chamois, R. rupicapra 
Family: Suidae (pigs)
Subfamily: Suinae
Genus: Sus
Wild boar, S. scrofa

See also 
 Wildlife of Metropolitan France
 List of chordate orders
 Lists of mammals by region
 Mammal classification

References

External links

Mammals
France
 Metropolitan France